The Town of Crawford is a Statutory Town in Delta County, Colorado, United States. The town population was 403 at the 2020 United States Census. The surrounding mesas and valleys support a farming and ranching community.

History
Crawford was founded in 1882. The town was named for George A. Crawford, governor-elect of Kansas and a founder of Grand Junction, Colorado. A post office has been in operation at Crawford since 1883.

Pioneer Days 
For 40 years during the second weekend in June, Crawford Country holds a town festival called Pioneer Days, starting with a parade and ending with a fireworks display over the reservoir at Crawford State Park.

The Pioneer Days' schedule usually includes a locally-produced Melodrama starting on Thursday evening and followed by 2 shows on Saturday.  Friday evening includes a benefit auction, baking contest, and Fire Auxiliary BBQ dinner at Town Hall. Saturday includes craft booths, throwing a horseshoe, and racing outhouses. The finale is the fireworks display on Saturday evening at Crawford State Park.

Geography
Crawford is located at  (38.704235, −107.610925). It is seventy highway miles southeast of Grand Junction.

Demographics

As of the census of 2000, there were 366 people, 147 households, and 104 families residing in the town. The racial makeup of the town was 96.72% White, 1.64% from other races, and 1.64% from two or more races. Hispanic or Latino of any race were 2.19% of the population.

There were 147 households, out of which 36.7% had children under the age of 18 living with them, 51.7% were married couples living together, 12.9% had a female householder with no husband present, and 28.6% were non-families. 25.9% of all households were made up of individuals, and 14.3% had someone living alone who was 65 years of age or older.  The average household size was 2.49 and the average family size was 2.88.

In the town, the population was spread out, with 30.3% under the age of 18, 5.7% from 18 to 24, 27.3% from 25 to 44, 21.3% from 45 to 64, and 15.3% who were 65 years of age or older.  The median age was 36 years. For every 100 females, there were 108.0 males.  For every 100 females age 18 and over, there were 96.2 males.

The median income for a household in the town was $23,281, and the median income for a family was $27,500. Males had a median income of $37,917 versus $16,563 for females. The per capita income for the town was $13,284.  About 23.5% of families and 29.4% of the population were below the poverty line, including 45.8% of those under age 18 and 15.9% of those age 65 or over.

Notable residents
 Joe Cocker (1944–2014), singer

See also

Colorado
Bibliography of Colorado
Index of Colorado-related articles
Outline of Colorado
List of counties in Colorado
List of municipalities in Colorado
List of places in Colorado
Black Canyon of the Gunnison National Park

References

External links

Town of Crawford website
CDOT map of the Town of Crawford
The Delta County Independent, the local community weekly covering Crawford and the rest of Delta County

Towns in Delta County, Colorado
Towns in Colorado